Field hockey at the 1991 Pan American Games in Havana took place from 3 to 15 August 1991. Eighteen teams (ten for men and eight for women) competed in the tournament.

Medal summary

Medal table

Men's tournament

Group stage

Group A

Group B

Ninth to tenth place classification

Fifth to eighth place classification

5–8th place semi-finals

Seventh place game

Fifth place game

Medal round

Semi-finals

Bronze medal match

Gold medal match

Final standings

 Qualified for the 1992 Summer Olympics

 Qualified for the 1991 Olympic Qualifier

Women's tournament

Group stage

Group A

Group B

Fifth to eighth place classification

5–8th place semi-finals

Seventh place game

Fifth place game

Medal round

Semi-finals

Bronze medal match

Gold medal match

Final standings

 Qualified for the 1991 Olympic Qualifier

Notes

References
 Pan American Games field hockey medalists on HickokSports

Events at the 1991 Pan American Games
Pan American Games
1991
1991 Pan American Games
1991